Bluff Nature Reserve is a 45 hectare protected pan and forest in the suburb of The Bluff, Durban, South Africa.  The park was proclaimed in 1974, making it Durban's oldest nature reserve, and is managed by Ezemvelo KZN Wildlife.

The nature reserve has bird watching facilities which overlook the pan.  There is a self-guided trail throughout the reserve.

Flora and fauna
The pan section of the park contains the remnant of a large swamp that once covered the area, while the forest section comprises a small patch of coastal lowland forest.

Birds 
The following birds are found in the reserve:
 Cormorants
 Crakes
 Spoonbills
 Warblers

Mammals 
The following mammals are found in the reserve:
 Banded Mongoose
 Common Rodent Mole
 Giant Musk Shrew
 Grey Climbing Mouse 
 Hottentot Golden Mole
Multimammate Mouse
 Slender Mongoose
 Vervet Monkey

References 

Nature reserves in South Africa